The MG 81 is a German belt fed 7.92×57mm Mauser machine gun which was used in flexible installations in World War II Luftwaffe aircraft, in which capacity it replaced the older drum magazine-fed MG 15.

The MG 81 was developed by Mauser as a derivative of their successful MG 34 general-purpose machine gun. Development focus was to reduce production cost and time and to optimize the machine gun for use in aircraft. Developed in 1938/1939, it was in production from 1940 to 1945.

A special twin-mount MG 81Z (the Z suffix stands for Zwilling, meaning "twin") was introduced in 1942. It paired up two of the weapons on one mount to provide even more firepower with a maximum cyclic rate of fire of 3,200 rounds per minute without requiring much more space than a standard machine gun.
Towards the end of the war many specimens were delivered to the army and equipped for use in ground battles with shoulder rest and bipod.

Applications
The MG 81Z was found in many unique installations in Luftwaffe combat aircraft, such as a pair of MG 81Z (for a total of four guns) installed in the hollow tail cone of the Dornier Do 217. Designated R19 (R for Rüstsatz) as a factory designed field conversion/upgrade kit, it allowed the pilot of the Do 217 to shoot at pursuers.

Another application was the Gießkanne (Watering can), an externally mounted pod with three gun pairs, making a total of six guns and their ammunition. Able to fire at a cyclic rate of 9,000 rounds per minute, this was attached to Junkers Ju 87 or Ju 88 in an underwing mount and used to strafe ground targets.

Specifications
MG 81
 Weight: 
 Length:   ( with flash hider)
 Rate of fire: 1,400–1,600 rpm (sS ball ammunition)
 Rate of fire: 1,700–1,800 rpm
 Rate of fire: 800 rpm (coaxial mount)

MG 81Z
 Weight: 12.9 kg (28.44 lb)
 Length: 915 mm (965& mm with flash hider)
 Rate of fire: 2,800–3,200 rpm (sS ball ammunition)
 Rate of fire: 3,400–3,600 rpm

See also
 ShKAS
 Vickers K machine gun
 List of firearms
 List of secondary and special-issue World War II infantry weapons

References

External links

 Airwar.ru (Russian language)
 Luftwaffe39-45 (Portuguese language) 
 Full size images for the MG81

7.92×57mm Mauser machine guns
MG 017 machine gun
Machine guns of Germany
World War II infantry weapons of Germany
Weapons and ammunition introduced in 1940